Avudaiyanoor is a village in Tamil Nadu, India. It is located in the Pavoorchatram town of Tenkasi taluk in Tirunelveli district. The population of the village is 15,587 as of the 2011 census. It is developing, and PMGSY (Pradhan Mantri Gram Sadak Yojna) is making new roads in the village.

Geography 
Avudaiyanoor is situated in the foothills of Western Ghats, between Tuticorin and Quilon highway National highway. Avudaiyanoor is 9 km (5.6 mi) east of Tenkasi and 45 km (28 mi) west of Tirunelveli, on the Tenkasi-Tirunelveli State Highway. The nearest popular train stations are Tenkasi and Tirunelveli.

Education 

Punitha Arulappar Higher Secondary School is located here.

Demographics 
The population consists of Hindus and Christians. Hindus are the majority of the population.

References 

Villages in Tirunelveli district